Rhome may refer to:

 Rhome, Texas, United States, a city
 Jerry Rhome (born 1942), American former National Football League quarterback
 Rhome Nixon (born 1944), retired Canadian Football League player